Ives Fabián Quintana (born December 23, 1983 in Mendoza, Argentina) is an Argentine footballer currently playing for ESPOLI in Ecuador.

Teams
  Miramar Misiones 2002-2003
  Sud América 2004
  Unión San Felipe 2005
  Sud América 2005
  Cerro Largo 2006
  Deportivo Jutiapa 2006-2007
  Deportivo Marquense 2007-2008
  Trentino 2009-2010
  ESPOLI 2011
  Sestri Levante 2011-2014

References
 Profile at BDFA 
 Profile at Tenfield Digital 

1983 births
Living people
Argentine footballers
Argentine expatriate footballers
Unión San Felipe footballers
Miramar Misiones players
C.D. ESPOLI footballers
Expatriate footballers in Chile
Expatriate footballers in Italy
Expatriate footballers in Ecuador
Expatriate footballers in Uruguay
Expatriate footballers in Guatemala
Association football forwards
Sportspeople from Mendoza, Argentina